Arabic Afrikaans or Lisan-e-Afrikaans was a form of Afrikaans written in Arabic script. It began in the 1830s in the madrasa in Cape Town. Beside a 16th-century manuscript in the German language written with Arabic script, it is the only Germanic language known to have been written in the Arabic script.

Letters

Overview 

The Arabic Afrikaans is a variant of the Arabic alphabet used to write Afrikaans. It consists of 36 letters:

Note: This alphabet is the Persian form of the Arabic alphabet, with 36 letters, including extra letters for sounds that are not in the Arabic alphabet.

Vowels

Phonology

Consonants

Texts

Seventy-four Arabic Afrikaans texts are extant. The earliest, the "Hidyat al-Islam", is dated 1845, though its source manuscript no longer exists. The oldest surviving manuscript, which describes the basic Islamic learning, was written by the imam Abdul-Kahhar ibn Abdul-Malik in 1868. The most professional version was written in 1869 by Abu Bakr Effendi, who came from Istanbul to the Cape in 1862.

Uiteensetting van die Godsdiens

One of the best examples of this literature was Uiteensetting van die Godsdiens ("Exposition of the Religion"), a book laying out Islamic traditions according to the Hanafi religious law. Written by Abu Bakr Effendi, it was printed using Arabic script throughout, but contained transcriptions of Afrikaans.

According to one of the three experts in this field, the German , about 20 people were responsible for the text, but the most important contributors to Arabic Afrikaans opinion were:
Abdul Kahhar ibn Hajji Abdul Malik (early 19th century)
Ahmad ibn Muhammad ibn Baha ud-Din (mid-19th century)
Ismail ibn Muhammad Hanif (mid-19th century)
Abd ur-Rahman ibn Muhammad Al-Iraqi (late 19th century), and
Abu Bakr Effendi (late 19th century).

This is a paragraph of the book Uiteensetting van die godsdiens:
Transcription of the Arabic-alphabet text. The italics mark non-Afrikaans words:
Iek bagent diesie kitab met Allah (ta'ala) sain naam. Allah (ta'ala) es rizq giefar ien dunya fer al wat liefandag ies. Allah (ta'ala) es beriengar ien die gannat ien dag ahirat fer al die miesie an djinns wat oewhap iman gadoet het. Al die dank an parais es rieg fer Allah (ta'ala) alien. Allah (ta'ala) het gagief fer oewhans Islam sain agama. Islam sain agama oek waas gawies fantefoewhar Ibrahim sain agama... An Allah (ta'ala) het gamaak die Qur'an rasulullah sain hadit fer seker dalil fer oewhans... An Allah (ta'ala) het galaat oewhans wiet die riegtie wieg fan die ilms an gahelp fer oewhans oewham ta lier ander miesie oewhap die riegtie manierie.
Translation into modern standard Afrikaans:
Ek begin hierdie boek met Allah (hy is verhewe) se naam. Allah (h.i.v.) is onderhouer in die wêreld vir al wat lewendig is. Allah (h.i.v.) is bringer in die paradys in die laaste dag vir al die mense en djinns wat oop iman gedoen het (m.a.w. in die geloof gesterwe het). Al die dank en prys is reg vir Allah (h.i.v.) alleen. Allah het gegee vir ons Islam se godsdiens. Islam se godsdiens ook was gewees vantevore Abraham se godsdiens...En Allah (h.i.v.) het gemaak die Koran en die profeet se hadit vir seker bewys vir ons...En Allah (h.i.v.) het gelaat ons weet die regte weg van die godsdienswetenskappe en gehelp vir ons om te leer ander mense op die regte manier.

The Arabic-alphabet version uses an Arabic word in several places where modern Afrikaans uses a Germanic word, e.g. dunya دنيا for wêreld, meaning "world". The Arabic words are entirely unknown in Afrikaans.

Without the above Translation into modern standard Afrikaans (which is in itself not standard Afrikaans although much closer to it), it is nearly impossible for an Afrikaans-speaking person to understand the above Transcription of the Arabic-alphabet text. Some words do however appear to resemble phonetic transliterations between Arabic script and the version of Afrikaans spoken by Cape Coloured people, mixed with Dutch.

Islam arrived among the Malays during the early 15th century and these works were most likely teaching tools; a way for Muslim teachers to instruct Malay slaves in the Cape while not necessarily being able to speak Dutch very well or at all.

Qur'an
An example that used Arabic vowels was a handwritten Arabic–Afrikaans bilingual Quran (perhaps written in the 1880s). In it, for example, Surah 67, Ayah 1 says:

(° = vowel sign missing, ň = /ŋ/ as in "king", ʿ = ayn, underlined = in Arabic.)

Here in the Afrikaans text:
  ň is written as ayn but with three dots above 
  v is written as 
  f in "fir" has both an  vowel and an  vowel.
 The Afrikaans preposition by is written as part of the next word, likely by copying Arabic language usage with some prepositions.
 The Afrikaans word al = "all" is written as part of the next word, likely by copying Arabic language usage with - = "the".

Lexicon

Numerals 
Arabic Afrikaans used Eastern Arabic numerals. The following is the list of basic cardinal numerals with the spelling in the Afrikaans Latin alphabet:

See also
 Aljamiado
 Cape Malays
 Islam in South Africa

References 

 "Abu Bakr se 'Uiteensetting van die Godsdiens'", A. van Selms, 1979, North-Holland Publishing Company, Amsterdam/Oxford/New York.  (online version Abu Bakr Effendi, Uiteensetting van die godsdiens · dbnl)

External links

Afrikaans
Arabic alphabets
Islam in South Africa